Queen's Park High School or QPHS is a  co-educational secondary school and sixth form located in Queens Park, Chester, England. The school symbol is the heraldic lion, and the school uniform consists of a blue blazer with a small white lion on the left hand side, and black or blue trousers.

History
Queen's Park High School although only coming under its current name in 1971 is the oldest non-public school in Chester.

Boys' School
Chester City Grammar School for Boys developed out of a technical day school, which opened at the Grosvenor Museum in 1892. Following the Education Act, 1902, it was decided to adapt the day technical school to meet the requirements of the Act, and its name was changed to City and County School for Boys in June 1907. It was transferred to Chester Corporation in August 1908, but remained at the Grosvenor Museum, with its own Board of Governors (some of them being appointed by Chester Corporation), until 1912. The school then moved to new buildings in Queen's Park. In 1938 its name was changed to Chester City Grammar School for Boys, and in 1941 new premises were opened in Queen's Park. As the 1970s dawned the school came under the scheme for the reorganisation of schools in Chester, and Chester City Grammar School for Boys combined with Chester City High School for Girls, with the name of Queen's Park High School. The Headmaster of the combined school was appointed in 1970, and complete amalgamation of the boys' and girls' schools took effect from September 1971.

Girls' School
Chester City High School for Girls was established following the Education Act, 1902, which made provision for secondary education. It began in temporary premises, the Race Stands on the Roodee, on 23 January 1905. On 25 March 1912 new premises were opened in Queen's Park. Originally known as the City and County School for Girls, because the County Education Authority maintained a certain number of the places available to students, the name of the school was changed in 1938 to Chester City High School for Girls. Under the scheme for the reorganisation of schools in Chester, prepared by the City Education Officer in 1968, the City High School for Girls and City Grammar School for Boys combined to form a mixed High School. The headmaster of the combined school was appointed in 1970, but the headmistress of the City High School remained as associate headmistress until July 1971. From that date the City High School for Girls ceased to exist as a separate school.

Extracurriculars

Musicals and theatrical productions
QPHS has a long history of annual school performances which usually run for a week in the spring term.

Other musical events
Each year QPHS stages a Summer Concert and Candle Lit Christmas Evening. There is an active school orchestra. In February the school has an X Factor like event called The V Factor showcasing the talents of the school's pupils. There is an annual Battle of the Bands contest open to students from all local secondary schools.

School magazine
The Inkwell - from 1923 to 1959
Cestria - from 1959 to 1970
Queen's Park High School Magazine - Special issue in 1970
Newsletter - from 1971 to present

Headmasters
1893 to 1911, J.A. MacMichael
1912 to 1937, J.K. Wilkins
1938 to 1942, Eric Ayres
1942 to 1948, R.P. Challacombe
1949 to 1970, C. Race
1971 to 1989, Ken.D. Munden
1989 to 2009, A.D. Firman
2009 to 2015, S.J. Casey
2015 to 2021, L Watterson
2021 to present T Kearns

Notable Former pupils

Chester City Grammar School

 Russ Abbot, Comedian
 Sir Charles Bell CBE, Chairman of Coats Paton Ltd from 1967–75
 Stephen Byers, Labour MP for North Tyneside since 1997 and for Wallsend from 1992-7
 Sir John Enderby CBE 
 Prof Clifford Formston, Professor of Veterinary Surgery at the Royal Veterinary College from 1943–74
 John Golding, Labour MP for Newcastle-under-Lyme from 1969–86
 Professor Paul Gough, Vice-Chancellor of Arts University Bournemouth, and Chair of UKADIA
Keith Harris - Ventriloquist with Orville the Duck
 Jon Lloyd, Chief Executive since 2008 of UK Coal
 Bob Mills, Comedian/Writer - 1968-1972
 John G. Robinson, railway engineer
 Prof James Scudamore CB, Chief Veterinary Officer from 1997-2004

City & County School Chester for Girls
 Mary Whitehouse

See also
 The Queen's School, Chester, a similarly named independent girls' school founded in the town in 1878

References

External links
 The QPHS website
 EduBase

1892 establishments in England
Schools in Chester
Secondary schools in Cheshire West and Chester
Educational institutions established in 1892
Academies in Cheshire West and Chester